Huang Maoxing (born 16 June 1990 in Chaozhou, Guangdong) is a Chinese sprint canoeist. At the 2012 Summer Olympics, he competed in the Men's C-2 1000 metres with Li Qiang.

References

External links 
 
 
 

1990 births
Living people
People from Chaozhou
Sportspeople from Guangdong
Olympic canoeists of China
Canoeists at the 2012 Summer Olympics
Asian Games medalists in canoeing
Canoeists at the 2010 Asian Games
Chinese male canoeists
Medalists at the 2010 Asian Games
Asian Games silver medalists for China